Message to Venus (also known as M2V) is an American rock band from Puerto Rico that was formed in 2008 by Jandre Nadal. John Feliciano (guitar), Edgar Ramos (bass), and Juan Font (drums) then completed the current lineup.

History
They are now established in Florida, United States. The band once called De'fekt, changed their name after the rotations of members on their line up, and are established now with John Feliciano, Edgar Ramos, Jandre Nadal and Juan M Font. John is currently located in Miami Florida, and Edgar in Orlando Florida.  They all travel back and forth to join the other members located to play important venues.

Jandre was a former member of the band called Slimy Nuggetz who has experience on playing CBGB's and sharing stages with bands like Anthrax, Ill Niño, Puya, Circo, Caramelos de Cianuro, Sol D’Menta and many more in nearly every Rock Fest in Puerto Rico for the past 10 years not to mention U.S and South American tours. 
The other members when they were on De'fekt also gained local exposure by opening for Ill Niño and Nonpoint among others in their hometown of Puerto Rico.

In March 2010 Message to Venus released their first single titled "Cold & Grey" on online stores. The band started to play some venues in Miami were John is located and also some in Puerto Rico.  They release on February, a follow up material in 2011, their EP titled "The Envelope". Message to Venus is the first band out of Puerto Rico to be played on the "When Worlds Collide" segment on Sirius XM Octane.

The band has played several shows between Miami and Puerto Rico. The band is currently recording a full-length album produced by Leo Alvarez following by moving completely to the States at the end of 2011.

Band members
 Jandre Nadal - lead vocals, guitar
 John Feliciano - lead guitar
 Juan Font - drums
 Edgar Ramos - bass

Discography

Studio albums
 Victims & Villains (2015)

Extended plays (EP)
 The Envelope (2011)

Singles
 Change (2012)
 Universal You (Emir Feliciano Remix) (2012)
 Universal You  (2011)
 Cold & Grey (2010)

References

External links

Puerto Rican musical groups